Pune, also previously known as Poona, (the official name from 1818 until 1978) is one of the most important industrial and educational hubs of India, with an estimated population of 6,200,000. It has been ranked "the most liveable city in India" several times. Pune is also considered to be the cultural capital of Maharashtra and the educational capital of India. The city is situated to the west of the lush greenery of the Western ghats, surrounded by mountains and hill forts. It has thriving educational, IT, agricultural and manufacturing sectors along with a vibrant nightlife consisting of local & global restaurants, pubs and clubs.   

The city of Pune is part of Pune Metropolitan Region (PMR), along with Pimpri-Chinchwad and the three cantonment towns of Pune Camp, Khadki and Dehu Road. As of 2021, Pune Metropolitan Region is the largest metropolitan region in Maharashtra, with a geographical area of 7,256 sq km.  Pune and Pimpri-Chinchwad have their own municipal corporations: Pune Municipal Corporation and Pimpri-Chinchwad Municipal Corporation.

The city is on the right bank of the Mutha river, on the Deccan plateau. It is the administrative headquarters of the Pune district; In the 18th century, the city was the seat of the Peshwas, the prime ministers of the Maratha Empire, and one of the most important political centres in the Indian subcontinent. The city was previously also ruled by the Ahmadnagar Sultanate, the Mughals and the Adil Shahi dynasty. Historical landmarks include the Lal Mahal, the Kasba Ganapati temple and Shaniwar Wada. Major historical events involving the city include the Mughal–Maratha Wars and the Anglo-Maratha Wars.

Pune is the largest IT hub in India.  It is also the most important automobile and manufacturing hub of India. Pune has several world class educational institutions and is therefore widely regarded as "Oxford of the East". The city has emerged as a major global educational hub in recent decades, with nearly half of the total number of international students in the country studying in Pune. Distinguished institutes of engineering, information technology, film school as well as management science and advanced training, attract students and professionals from India and overseas.

Etymology
The earliest reference to Pune is an inscription on a Rashtrakuta Dynasty copper plate dated 937 CE, which refers to the town as Punya-Vishaya, meaning 'sacred news'. By the 13th century, it had come to be known as Punawadi.

During the Rashtrakuta dynasty, the city was referred to as Punnaka and Punyapur, while the copper plates of 758 and 768 CE show that the Yadava dynasty had renamed the city Punakavishaya and Punya Vishaya. 'Vishaya' means land, and 'Punaka' and 'Punya' mean holy. The city was known as Kasbe Pune when under the command of Maratha king Shivaji's father, Shahaji Raje Bhosale. Mughal emperor Aurangzeb renamed the city Muhiyabad (the only divergent naming) some time between 1703 and 1705 in memory of his great-grandson Muhi-ul-Milan, who died there. The name Muhiyabad was lost soon after Aurangzeb's death. Anglicized to Poona in 1857 by the English during British rule, the city's name was changed to Pune in 1978.

History

Early and Medieval Period 

Copper plates dated 858 and 868CE show that by the 9th century an agricultural settlement known as Punnaka existed at the location of the modern Pune. The plates indicate that this region was ruled by the Rashtrakuta dynasty. The Pataleshwar rock-cut temple complex was built during this era. Pune was part of the territory ruled by the Seuna Yadavas of Devagiri from the 9th century to 1327. Pune was under control of Muslim leaders till the late 16th century.

The Maratha Empire 
Pune was part of the Jagir (fiefdom) granted to Maloji Bhosale in 1599 for his services to the Nizamshahi (Ahmadnagar Sultanate). Pune was ruled by the Ahmadnagar Sultanate until it was annexed by the Mughals in the 17th century. Maloji Bhosale's grandson, Chhatrapati Shivaji Maharaj, the founder of the Maratha Empire, was born at the fort of Shivneri, about 90 km from Pune. It changed hands several times between the Mughals and the Marathas in the period 1680 to 1705.

After the destruction of the town in raids by the Adil Shahi dynasty in 1630 and again between 1636 and 1647, Dadoji Konddeo, the successor to Dhadphale, oversaw the reconstruction of the town. He stabilised the revenue collection and administrative systems of the areas around Pune and the neighbouring Maval region. He also developed effective methods to manage disputes and to enforce law and order. The Lal Mahal was commissioned in 1631 and construction was completed in 1640 AD. Chhatrapati Shivaji Maharaj spent his young years at the Lal Mahal. His mother, Jijabai is said to have commissioned the building of the Kasba Ganapati temple. The Ganesha idol consecrated at this temple has been regarded as the presiding deity (Gramadevata) of the city.

From 1703 to 1705, towards the end of the 27-year-long Mughal–Maratha Wars, the town was occupied by Aurangzeb and its name was changed to Muhiyabad. But the name was erased soon after Aurangzeb's death.

Peshwa Rule 

In 1720, Baji Rao I was appointed Peshwa (prime minister) of the Maratha Empire by Shahu I, the fifth Chhatrapati of the Maratha Empire. As the Peshwa, Bajirao moved his base from Saswad to Pune in 1728, marking the beginning of the transformation of what was a kasbah into a large city. He also commissioned the construction of the Shaniwar Wada on the right bank of the Mutha River. The construction was completed in 1730, ushering in the era of Peshwa control of the city. Bajirao's son and successor, Nanasaheb constructed a lake at Katraj on the outskirts of the city and an underground aqueduct to bring water from the lake to Shaniwar Wada and the city. The aqueduct was still in working order in 2004.

The patronage of the Maratha Peshwas resulted in a great expansion of Pune, with the construction of around 250 temples and bridges in the city, including the Lakdi Pul and the temples on Parvati Hill and many Maruti, Vithoba, Vishnu, Mahadeo, Rama, Krishna, and Ganesh temples. The building of temples led to religion being responsible for about 15% of the city's economy during this period. Pune prospered as a city during the reign of Nanasaheb Peshwa. He developed Saras Baug, Heera Baug, Parvati Hill and new commercial, trading, and residential localities. Sadashiv Peth, Narayan Peth, Rasta Peth and Nana Peth were developed. The Peshwa's influence in India declined after the defeat of Maratha forces at the Battle of Panipat but Pune remained the seat of power. In 1802 Pune was captured by Yashwantrao Holkar in the Battle of Poona, directly precipitating the Second Anglo-Maratha War of 1803–1805. The Peshwa rule ended with the defeat of Peshwa Bajirao II by the British East India Company in 1818.

Historian Govind Sakharam Sardesai lists 163 prominent families that held high ranks and played significant roles in politics, military, and finance in 18th century Pune. Of these 163 families, a majority(80) were Deshastha Brahmins, 46 were Chitpawan, 15 were Chandraseniya Kayastha Prabhu(CKP) whereas Karhade Brahmin and Saraswat accounted for 11 families each.

British Rule (1818 – 1947) 

The Third Anglo-Maratha War broke out between the Marathas and the British East India Company in 1817. The Peshwas were defeated at the Battle of Khadki (then spelled Kirkee) on 5November near Pune and the city was seized by the British. It was placed under the administration of the Bombay Presidency and the British built a large military cantonment to the east of the city (now used by the Indian Army). The Southern Command of the Indian Army was established in 1895 and has its headquarters in Pune cantonment.

The city of Pune was known as Poona during British rule. Poona Municipality was established in 1858. A railway line from Bombay to the city opened in 1858, run by the Great Indian Peninsula Railway (GIPR). Navi Peth, Ganj Peth (now renamed Mahatma Phule Peth) were developed during the British Raj.

Centre of Social Reform and Nationalism

Pune was prominently associated with the struggle for Indian independence. In the period between 1875 and 1910, the city was a centre of agitation led by Gopal Krishna Gokhale and Bal Gangadhar Tilak. The city was also a centre for social reform led by Gopal Ganesh Agarkar, Mahatma Jyotirao Phule, feminist Tarabai Shinde, Dhondo Keshav Karve and Pandita Ramabai. They demanded the abolition of caste prejudice, equal rights for women, harmony between the Hindu and Muslim communities, and better schools for the poor. Mahatma Gandhi was imprisoned at the Yerwada Central Jail several times and placed under house arrest at the Aga Khan Palace between 1942 and 1944, where both his wife Kasturba Gandhi and aide Mahadev Desai died. Savarkar used to study in Fergusson College and performed the "Holi" of foreign items near Mutha river bank .

Pune since Indian Independence 
After Indian independence from the British in 1947, Pune saw enormous growth transforming it into a modern metropolis. The Poona Municipal Council was reorganised to form the Pune Municipal Corporation (PMC) in 1950. The education sector in the city continued its growth in the post-independence era with the establishment of the University of Pune (now, Savitribai Phule Pune University) in 1949, the National Chemical Laboratory in 1950 and the National Defence Academy in 1955.

The establishment of Hindustan Antibiotics in 1954 marked the beginning of industrial development in the Hadapsar, Bhosari, and Pimpri areas. MIDC provided the necessary infrastructure for new businesses to set up operations. In the 1970s, several engineering companies were set up in the city, allowing it to vie with Chennai. In the 1990s, Pune began to attract foreign capital, particularly in the information technology and engineering industries. IT parks were established in Aundh, Viman Nagar, Hinjawadi, Wagholi, Kharadi and Balewadi-Baner region. As a result, the city saw a huge influx of people to the city due to opportunities offered by the manufacturing, and lately, the software industries.

The breach in the Panshet dam and the resulting flood of 1961 led to severe damage and destruction of housing close to the river banks. The mishap spurred the development of new suburbs and housing complexes. To integrate urban planning, the Pune Metropolitan Region was defined in 1967 covering the area under PMC, the Pimpri-Chinchwad Municipal Corporation, the three cantonments and the surrounding villages.

In 1998 work on the six-lane Mumbai-Pune expressway began; it was completed in 2001. In 2008 the Commonwealth Youth Games took place in Pune, which encouraged development in the northwest region of the city. On 13February 2010 a bomb exploded at the German Bakery in the upmarket Koregaon Park neighbourhood in eastern Pune, killing 17 and injuring 60. Evidence suggested that the Indian Mujahideen terrorist group carried out the attack.

21st-century 
Pune evolved greatly since Indian Independence, from notable universities, colleges and management schools, earning it the nickname of the 'Oxford Of The East', to being one of the most important automobile manufacturing hub. Pune is also home to the world's largest vaccine manufacturer, Serum Institute of India, which during the COVID-19 pandemic manufactured around 5,000 vaccine doses every minute.

Geography

Pune is situated at approximately 18° 32" north latitude and 73° 51" east longitude. The city's total area is 15.642 km2.

It is on the leeward side of the Sahyadri mountain range, which forms a barrier from the Arabian Sea.

The old city of Pune is at the confluence of the Mula and Mutha rivers. The Pavana, a tributary of Mula river and Indrayani river, a tributary of the Bhima river, traverse the northwest Neighbourhoods of Pune.

Cityscape

The modern city of Pune has many distinct neighbourhoods. These include the numerous peths of the old city on the eastern bank of the Mutha river, the cantonment areas of Khadki and Camp established by the British, and numerous suburbs. There are several Peths in usual localities of the Pune city.  The industrial growth in the Pimpri, Chinchwad, Akurdi, Nigdi and nearby areas allowed these areas to incorporate a new governing municipal corporation.

The Pune Metropolitan Region (PMR), initially defined in 1967, has grown to 7,256 km2 made up of the ten talukas of the Pune district. The areas of PMC and PCMC along with the three cantonment areas of Camp, Khadki, and Dehu Road form the urban core of the PMR, which also includes seven municipal councils and 842 villages.

Rapid industrialisation since the 1960s has led to large influx of people to the city. Housing supply has not kept pace with demand, causing the number of slum dwellings to increase. Approximately 36% of the population lives in 486 slum areas. Of these, 45% slum households do not have in-house toilet facilities and 10% do not have electricity. One third of the slums are on mixed ownership land. The living conditions in slums varies considerably, depending on their status (formal/informal) and in how far non-governmental organisations (NGOs), community organisations (CBOs) and government agencies are involved and committed to improving local living conditions. Since the 1990s a number of landmark integrated townships and gated communities have been developed in Pune such as Magarpatta, Nanded city, Amanora, Blue Ridge, Life Republic and Lavasa. They also offer business opportunities and access to infrastructure. According to the PMC, six townships with up to 15,000 housing units existed in Pune in 2012 and 25 more were in the planning process.

The Mercer 2017 Quality of Living Rankings evaluated living conditions in more than 440 cities around the world and ranked Pune at 145, second highest in India after Hyderabad at 144. The same source highlights Pune as being among evolving business centres and as one of nine emerging cities around the world with the citation "Hosts IT and automotive companies". The 2017 Annual Survey of India's City-Systems (ASICS) report, released by the Janaagraha Centre for Citizenship and Democracy, adjudged Pune as the best governed of 23 major cities.

Peths in Pune 

Peth is a general term in the Marathi language for a locality in Pune. Seventeen peths are located in Pune, which today constitute the old city of Pune. Most were established during the Maratha empire era under the Maratha and Peshwa rule of the city in the 18th century, before the arrival of the British. Pune is home to many distinctive peths, or place names, for various neighborhoods. The majority of them bore the names of their founders and days of the week.

Climate
Pune experiences three seasons: summer, monsoon, and winter. Typical summer months are from mid-March to mid-June, with maximum temperatures sometimes reaching . The warmest month in Pune is May. The city often has heavy dusty winds in May, with humidity remaining high. Even during the hottest months, the nights are usually cool due to Pune's high altitude.

Hailstorms are not unheard of.
For most of December and January the daytime temperature hovers around  while overnight temperatures are below . On March 1 2015, the city recorded a daytime high of only 18.9°C (66°F), which was the lowest recorded maximum temperature.

Seismology

The India Meteorological Department has assessed this area as being in Zone 3, on a scale of 2 to 5, with 5 being the most prone to earthquakes. Pune has experienced some moderateand many lowintensity earthquakes in its history.

Demographics

The city has a population of 3,124,458; while 5,057,709 people reside in the Pune Urban Agglomeration . The latter was  4,485,000 in 2005. According to the Pune Municipal Corporation (PMC), 40% of the population lived in slums in 2001.

Since Pune is a major industrial metropolis, it has attracted migrants from all parts of India. The number of people migrating to Pune rose from 43,900 in 2001 to 88,200 in 2005. The sharp increase in population during the decade 1991–2001 led to the absorption of 38 fringe villages into the city. The top five source areas of migrants are Karnataka, Uttar Pradesh, Andhra Pradesh, Gujarat, and Rajasthan. The Sindhis in the city are mostly refugees and their descendants, who came to the area after the partition of India in 1947. Initially they settled in the Pimpri area, which is still home to a large number of Sindhi people. However, they are also present in other parts of the city. As agriculture has dwindled in recent decades, immigration of the erstwhile rural peoples now accounts for 70 percent of the population growth.

Marathi is the official and most spoken language. The average literacy rate of Pune was 86.15% in 2011 compared to 80.45% in 2001.

Religion 

Hinduism is the dominant religion in Pune. Other religions with a significant presence include Islam, Buddhism, Jainism, Christianity, Sikhism and Zoroastrianism.

Of the many Hindu temples in the city, the Parvati temple complex on Parvati Hill and at least 250 others date back to the 18th century. These temples were commissioned by the Peshwas, who ruled the city at the time, and are dedicated to various deities including Maruti, Vithoba, Vishnu, Mahadeo, Rama, Krishna and Ganesh. The historic temples of Kasba Ganapati, the Tambadi (Red) Jogeshwari are considered the guardian deities of the city. Dagdusheth Halwai Ganapati Temple is the richest Ganesh temple in Pune. Pune has two of the most important pilgrimage centres of the Varkari sect of the Bhakti movement in Maharashtra, namely Alandi where the samadhi of 13th century Saint Dnyaneshwar is located and Dehu where the 17th century Saint Tukaram lived. Every year in the Hindu month of Ashadh (June/July), the Paduka (symbolic sandals) of these saints are carried in a pilgrimage, the Pandharpur Vari, to meet Vithoba. The procession makes a stopover in the city on its way to Pandharpur attracting hundreds of thousands of Varkaris and devotees. Other important Hindu pilgrimage sites in PMR or the district include Jejuri, and five of Ashtavinayak Ganesh temples. The Shrutisagar Ashram houses the Vedanta Research Centre and a unique temple of Dakshinamurthy.

Prominent mosques include Chand Tara Masjid, Jama Masjid, and Azam Campus Masjid. Chand Tara Masjid, located in Nana Peth, is one of the biggest and most important mosques in Pune as it is the city headquarters (markaz) for the Tablighi Jamaat. Pune is also the birthplace of Meher Baba, although his followers usually travel to Meherabad to visit his tomb. Hazrat Babajan, identified by Meher Baba as one of the five perfect masters, has a shrine (Dargah) erected in her honour under a neem tree in Pune Camp.

Pune has a distinct Christian community comprising Roman Catholic, CNI, Methodist, Presbyterians, Christian Missionaries helped in setting up sechools and colleges all over and also spread the message of faith. The city has several churches dedicated to different Christian denominations including St. Anthony's Shrine, Dapodi Church, etc. St. Patrick's Cathedral built in 1850 is the seat of the bishop of the Roman Catholic Diocese of Poona.

Pune has Jain temples dating back to the Peshwa era. At present, there are more than one hundred Jain temples in PMR with the one at Katraj being the largest. Pune has over 20 Gurdwaras, with Gurdwara Guru Nanak Darbar in Pune Camp and Gurdwara Shri Guru Singh Sabha in Ganesh Peth being the ones situated in the heart of the city. The 19th-century Ohel David Synagogue, known locally as Lal Deval, is said to be one of the largest synagogues in Asia outside Israel. The Sir Jamsetjee Jejeebhoy Agiary is a prominent Zoroastrian temple.

Pune has been associated with several significant recent spiritual teachers. The controversial Guru Osho, formerly the self-styled Bhagwan Rajneesh, lived and taught in Pune for much of the 1970s and 1980s. The Osho International Meditation Resort, one of the world's largest spiritual centres, is located in Koregaon Park and attracts visitors from over a hundred countries. The meditation resort organises music and meditation festival every year during monsoon, known as Osho Monsoon Festival. Number of well known artists around the world participates in the event.

Economy 

Pune is a well known manufacturing and industrial center of India. With an estimated nominal GDP of Rs. 3,31,478 crores for year 2019-20, Pune District is the third largest contributor to the economy of Maharashtra, after Mumbai and Thane. Pune has the fifth largest metropolitan economy and the sixth highest per capita income in the country. As per the Directorate of Economics and Statistics (Government of Maharashtra), the GDP per capita of Pune District in 2019-20 was Rs. 3,16,848. Pune has historically been known as a center for higher education and has been referred to as the educational capital of India. In 2016, it was reported that nearly 500,000 students from across India and abroad study in Pune at nine universities and more than a hundred educational institutes. Pune is a major manufacturing and industrial hub. In 2014-15, the manufacturing sector provided employment to over 500,000 people.

The city serves as headquarters to many companies. The Kirloskar Group came to Pune in 1945 when Kirloskar Brothers Ltd setup Kirloskar Oil Engines, India's largest diesel engine company, at Khadki. The group has several group companies in Pune including Kirloskar Pneumatics and the groups flagship company Kirloskar Brothers Limited, one of India's largest manufacturers and exporters of pumps and the largest infrastructure pumping project contractor in Asia. Kalyani Group based in Pune owns a subsidiary Bharat Forge which operates world’s largest single location forging facility consisting of fully automated forging press lines and state-of-the-art machining facility in Pune. Bajaj Auto is ranked as the world's fourth largest two- and three-wheeler manufacturer is based in Pune.

The city is known for its automotive industry. A large number of automobile companies such as Bajaj Auto, Tata Motors, Mahindra & Mahindra, Skoda cars, Mercedes Benz, Force Motors, Kinetic Motors, General Motors, Land Rover, Jaguar, Renault, Volkswagen, and Fiat have there manufacturing plants in Pune primarily in Chakan. The Independent referred Chakan as India's "Motor City". Serum Institute of India, the world's fifth largest vaccine producer by volume, is based in Pune.

The Rajiv Gandhi Infotech Park in Hinjawadi is a ₹ 60,000 crore (US$8.9 billion) project by the Maharashtra Industrial Development Corporation (MIDC). Besides Hinjawadi, IT companies are also located at Magarpatta, Kharadi and several other parts of the city. As of 2017, the IT sector employs more than 300,000 people. Pune has also emerged as a new hub for tech startups in India. NASSCOM, in association with MIDC, has started a co-working space for city based startups under its 10,000 startups initiative at Kharadi MIDC. Pune Food Cluster development project is an initiative funded by the World Bank. It is being implemented with the help of Small Industries Development Bank of India, Cluster Craft to facilitate the development of the fruit and vegetable processing industries in and around Pune.

Pune is an emerging center for VFX services, with Indian and international studios such as Anibrain, Reliance Animation, philm CGI, Digikore Studios, HMX Media, Stereo D, Framestore and Method Studios having established their facilities here.

Major technology companies Ubisoft Pune, Zensar Technologies, Patni Computer Systems, Persistent Systems, Indiacom, Harbinger Knowledge Products, Seniority, Monjin, Mylab Discovery Solutions, Quick Heal and KPIT Technologies are headquartered in Pune. Indian tech giant Infosys was founded in Pune who have a mega campus in city. Zensar Technologies is located in a mega campus called Zensar Park.

The Meetings, Incentives, Conferencing, Exhibitions trade is expected to be boosted since the Pune International Exhibition and Convention Centre (PIECC) opened in 2017. It has seven exhibition centres, a convention centre, a golf course, a five-star hotel, a business complex, shopping malls, and residences. The US$115 million project was developed by the Pimpri-Chinchwad New Town Development Authority.

World Trade Center (WTC) Pune is a 1.6 million sq. ft. complex built to foster international trade. WTC Pune is part of the World Trade Centers Association.

Culture

Architecture

Historical attractions include the 8th century rock-cut Pataleshwar cave temple, the 18th century Shaniwarwada, the 19th century Aga Khan Palace, Lal Mahal and Sinhagad fort. Shinde Chhatri, located at Wanowrie, is a memorial dedicated to the great Maratha general, Mahadaji Shinde (Scindia). The old city had many residential buildings with courtyards called Wada. However, many of these have been demolished and replaced by modern buildings.

A renowned wada in Pune is the last residential palace of the Peshwa called Vishrambaug Wada which is currently being renovated by the city corporation. The city is also known for its British Raj bungalow architecture and the Garden Cities Movement layout of the Cantonment from the early 20th century. Landmark architectural works by Christopher Charles Benninger surround the city, including the Mahindra United World College of India, the Centre for Development Studies and Activities, the YMCA Retreat at Nilshi and the Samundra Institute of Maritime Studies.

Museums, parks and zoos
Museums in Pune include the Raja Dinkar Kelkar Museum, Mahatma Phule Industrial Museum, Deccan college museum of Maratha history, Dr. Babasaheb Ambedkar Museum, Joshi's Museum of Miniature Railway and the Pune Tribal Museum. Pune also houses Blades of Glory Cricket Museum which is the biggest cricket museum in the world. The College of Military Engineering has an archive and an equipment museum; this includes a rail exhibit with a metre-gauge train. The Aga Khan Palace, where Mahatma Gandhi was interned during the Quit India movement, has a memorial dedicated to his wife, Kasturba Gandhi who died during the internment.

For a city of its size, Pune has very few large public parks and gardens. Parks and green spaces in the city include the Kamala Nehru Park, Sambhaji Park, Shahu Udyan, Peshwe Park, Saras Baug, Empress Gardens,  and Bund Garden. The Pu La Deshpande Udyan is a replica of the Korakuen Garden in Okayama, Japan. The Hanuman hill, Vetal hill, and Taljai Hills are protected nature reserves on hills within the city limits.

The Rajiv Gandhi Zoological Park is located in Katraj. The zoo, earlier located at Peshwe Park, was merged with the reptile park at Katraj in 1999.

Performing arts 
Both experimental and professional theatre receive extensive patronage from the Marathi community. The Tilak Smarak Ranga Mandir, Bal Gandharva Ranga Mandir, Bharat Natya Mandir, Yashwantrao Chavan Natya Gruha, and Sudarshan Rangmanch are prominent theatres in the city.

Ganesh Kala Krida Rangamanch is the largest indoor theatre in the city, with a seating capacity of approximately 45,000. The Sawai Gandharva Sangeet Mahotsav, one of the most prominent and sought-after Indian classical music festivals in India, is held in Pune every year in December. It commemorates the life and achievements of Sawai Gandharva. The concept of Diwāḷī Pahāṭ (lit. Diwali dawn) originated in Pune as a music festival on the morning of the festival of Diwali.

Festivals 
Ganesh Festival is widely and publicly celebrated in Pune. Lokamanya Bal Gangadhar Tilak started the public celebration of the festival as a means to circumvent the colonial British government ban on Hindu gatherings through its anti-public assembly legislation in 1892. Pandals with Ganesh idols are erected all across Pune. Many ganesh mandals (local organisations) display live or figurine shows called Dekhava during the festival. These shows often carry socially relevant messages. Processions of Ganpati are accompanied by Dhol-Tasha pathaks (groups who play Dhol-Tasha percussion instruments). Involvement of these pathaks has become a cultural identity of Pune with there being over 150 such groups operating in and around Pune. Jnana Prabodhini, a social organisation in Pune is widely accredited for founding the tradition of Dhol-Tasha pathaks.

Sports

Badminton in its modern form originated in Pune. The game of badminton was also known as Poona or Poonah after the then British garrison town of Poona where it was particularly popular and where the first rules for the game were drawn up in 1873. (Games employing shuttlecocks have been played for centuries across Eurasia, but the modern game of badminton developed in the mid-19th century among the British as a variant of the earlier game of battledore and shuttlecock. "Battledore" was an older term for "racquet".)

Every year women professional tennis players' ITF $25K tournament take place at Deccan Gymkhana club's tennis courts. It also hosts men's ITF $15K event. ATP 250 Maharashtra Open annually held at Pune. It is India's biggest professional tennis championship and only ATP event of India. Where top professional tennis players participate.

Popular games and sports in Pune include athletics, cricket, basketball, badminton, field hockey, football, tennis, kabaddi, paragliding, kho-kho,wrestling, rowing, and chess. The Chhatrapati Shivaji Stadium in Balewadi is the venue for wrestling and other traditional sports. The Royal Connaught Boat Club is one of several boating clubs on the Mula-Mutha river. Pune has basketball courts at the Deccan Gymkhana and at Fergusson College. Pune Skatepark is a skateboarding park built in Sahakarnagar, consisting of an eight-foot bowl in a 3,000 square foot flatground. Other prominent sporting institutions in Pune include the Nehru Stadium, the PYC Hindu Gymkhana, the Poona Golf Club and the Poona Cricket Club. The PYC has a long history of excellence in cricket. It is one of the oldest clubs in India and has produced many great cricketers, including D. B. Deodhar, Vijay Hazare and C. K. Naid.

The Pune International Marathon is an annual marathon conducted in Pune. The National Games of 1994 and the 2008 Commonwealth Youth Games were held in the city at the Balewadi Stadium. The Deccan Gymkhana has hosted Davis Cup matches on several occasions. The 37,000 seating capacity Maharashtra Cricket Association Stadium has hosted international cricket – T20s, One Day Internationals, and a test match. The National Education Foundation organises Enduro3, a cross country adventure race in Pune. It is a two- or three-day event with activities including cycling, trekking, river-crossing and rifle shooting. The course has two training tracks and two racing surfaces. The racing season is from July to October and includes the Pune Derby, the RWITC Invitational, the Independence Cup and the Southern Command Cup. The city hosted the 2009 FIVB Men's Junior World Championship.

Teams 
The Maharashtra cricket team, one of the three teams of the Maharashtra Cricket Association that compete in interstate matches and leagues such as the Ranji Trophy, is based in the city. Pune Warriors India (2011–2014) and Rising Pune Supergiant (2016-2017) were the two teams based in Pune to play in the Indian Premier League. Poona District Football Association (PDFA) was established in 1972 and currently has more than 100 registered teams. There were two popular football clubs (now defunct) competing in the I-League from the city: Pune FC, and DSK Shivajians FC. FC Pune City was an Indian Super League football club in Pune. Established in 2014, FC Pune City became the only professional football club in India to have teams which participated at all levels of professional football; Senior Team (ISL), U-18 Team (Elite league), U- 16 Team, U-14 Team and the Women's Team. The city is home to the Pune Peshwas, runners-up in the 2015 UBA Pro Basketball League season. Pune also has an American football franchise, called the Pune Marathas, which began playing in the inaugural season of the Elite Football League of India in 2011 and which plays at the Balewadi Stadium.

Government and public services

Civic administration

Pune Municipal Corporation and Pimpri-Chinchwad Municipal Corporation are the civic bodies responsible for local government. It comprises two branches, the executive branch headed by the Municipal Commissioner, an IAS officer appointed by the Government of Maharashtra, and an elected deliberative branch, the general body, headed by the Mayor of Pune. Municipal elections are held every five years to elect councillors, commonly known as "corporators", who form the general body. The current general body of the PMC elected in February 2017 has 162 corporators representing 41 multi-member wards (39 with 4 corporators each and 2 with 3 each). The general body, in turn, elects the mayor and the deputy mayor. The mayor has a ceremonial role as the first citizen and ambassador of the city while the actual executive power lies with the municipal commissioner. For policy deliberations, corporators form several committees. Perhaps the most important of these is the 16-member Standing Committee, half of whose members retire every year. The Standing Committee and the 15 ward committees are in charge of financial approvals. PMC was ranked 8th out of 21 Indian cities for best governance and administrative practices in 2014. It scored 3.5 out of 10 compared to the national average of 3.3.

The Pune City Police Department is the law enforcement agency for the city of Pune. It is a division of the Maharashtra Police and is headed by the Police Commissioner, an officer of the Indian Police Service. The Pune Police Department reports to the State Ministry of Home Affairs. A separate police commissionerate was announced for PCMC, Pune in April 2018 to be carved out of the historic Pune Police Department. The new commissionerate took charge on 15 August 2018.

Pune Metropolitan Region Development Authority (PMRDA) was formed on 31March 2015 and is responsible for the integrated development of the PMR.

Utility services
The PMC supplies the city with potable water that is sourced from the Khadakwasla Reservoir. There are five other reservoirs in the area that supply water to the city and the greater metropolitan area.
The city lacks the capacity to treat all the sewage it generates, which leads to the Mutha river containing only sewage outside the monsoon months. In 2009 only 65% of sewage generated was treated before being discharged into the rivers. According to Anwesha Borthakur and Pardeep Singh, unplanned and haphazard development has turned the Mula-Mutha river into a dead river. The Pune municipal corporation has undertaken plans to restore life into the rivers. PMC is also responsible for collecting solid waste. Around 1,600 tons of solid waste is generated in Pune each day. The waste consists of 53% organic, compostable material; and 47% inorganic material, of which around half is recyclable. The unrecovered solid waste is transported to the dumping grounds in Urali devachi.

The state owned Maharashtra State Electricity Distribution Company Limited supplies electricity to the city. Bharat Sanchar Nigam Limited (BSNL), owned by the central government, as well as private enterprises such as Reliance Jio, Bharti Airtel and Vodafone Idea are the leading telephone and cell phone service providers in the city.

Healthcare

Healthcare in the PMR is provided by private and public facilities. Primary care is provided by practitioners of Allopathic medicine as well as traditional and alternative medicine (i.e. Ayurved, Homeopathy and Unani). For minor and chronic ailments, people in the region often rely on practitioners of traditional medicine.
The PMR is served by three government hospitals: Sassoon Hospital, Budhrani and Dr Ambedkar Hospital. There are also a number of private hospitals such as Ranka Hospital, Sahyadri, Jahangir Nursing Home, Sancheti Hospital, Aditya Birla Memorial Hospital, KEM Hospital, Ruby Hall, Naidu Hospital and Smile Inn Dental Clinic Pune.

Education and research

Pune has over a hundred educational institutes and more than nine deemed universities apart from the Savitribai Phule Pune University (SPPU; formerly University of Pune), which is the largest University in the country based on total number of affiliated colleges. Higher education institutes attract international students mainly from the Middle Eastern countries such as Iran, and United Arab Emirates, and also African countries such as Ethiopia and Kenya. Pune is the largest centre for Japanese learning in India. Other languages taught in the city include German, which is taught at the Goethe-Institut, and French, which is taught at Alliance Française. Several colleges in Pune have student exchange programmes with colleges in Europe.

Primary and secondary Education

The PMC runs 297 primary schools and 30 secondary and higher secondary schools. While it is mandatory for the PMC to provide primary education under state law, secondary education is an optional duty. In the rural and suburban areas of the PMR, public primary schools are run by the Pune Zilla Parishad. Private schools are run by education trusts and are required to undergo mandatory inspection by the concerned authorities. Private schools are eligible for financial aid from the state government. Public schools are affiliated to the Maharashtra State Board of Secondary and Higher Secondary Education (State Board). The language of instruction in public schools is primarily Marathi, although the PMC also runs Urdu, English and Kannada medium schools. Along with these languages, private schools also offer instruction in Hindi and Gujarati. Private schools vary in their choice of curriculum and may follow the State Board or one of the two central boards of education, the CBSE or CISCE.

Jnana Prabodhini Prashala, located in Sadashiv Peth, is the first school for intellectually gifted and talented students in India.

Tertiary education
 Most colleges in Pune are affiliated to the SPPU (Savitribai Phule Pune University). Nine other universities have also been established in the city. Pune also hosts the Military Intelligence Training School which offers diploma courses in counter intelligence, combat intelligence, aerial imagery and interpretation, among others.

The College of Engineering Pune, an autonomous institute of the government of Maharashtra founded in 1854, is the third oldest engineering college in Asia. The Deccan Education Society was founded by local citizens in 1884, including social and political activist Bal Gangadhar Tilak, who was also responsible for founding Fergusson College in 1885. The Indian Law Society's (ILS) Law College is one of the top ten law schools in India. The Armed Forces Medical College (AFMC) and B. J. Medical College are among the top medical colleges in India. The AFMC consistently ranks among the top five medical colleges in India. The Film and Television Institute of India, one of only three Indian institutions in the global CILECT film school network, is located on Law College Road. The Lalit Kala Kendra is an undergraduate department of Music, Dance and Drama on the SPPU campus that has been operational since 1987. This department features a combination of gurukul and formal education systems. The College of Military Engineering (CME), the Army Institute of Physical Training, and the Institute of Armament Technology are also in Pune.

Symbiosis International University operates 33 colleges and institutions in the city, including the Symbiosis Institute of Business Management, the Symbiosis Institute of Management Studies, the Symbiosis Centre for Management and Human Resource Development, the Symbiosis Law School and the Symbiosis Institute of International Business. They are ranked among the top management and law institutes in the country. The Symbiosis Institute of Computer Studies and Research is one of the few colleges in India that promotes open source technology.

UWC Mahindra College, one of eighteen United World Colleges worldwide, and the third is Asia, offering the  International Baccalaureate (IB) Diploma Program (DP), is located near Pune.

Research institutes
Pune is home to a number of governmental and non-governmental research institutes focusing on a wide range of subject areas from the humanities to the sciences. The Ministry of Defence also runs a number of defence related education, training and research establishments in and around the city. Major research centers include:

 Agharkar Research Institute (ARI)
 Armament Research Development Establishment (ARDE)
 Armed Forces Medical College (India) (AFMC)
 Army Institute of Technology (AIT)
 Automotive Research Association of India (ARAI)
 Bhandarkar Oriental Research Institute (BORI)
 Central Institute of Road Transport  (CIRT)
 Central Water and Power Research Station (CW&PRS)
 Centre for Development of Advanced Computing (C-DAC)
 Defence Research and Development Organisation (DRDO)
 Defence Institute of Advanced Technology (DIAT)
 Film and Television Institute of India (FTII)
 Gokhale Institute of Politics and Economics
 High Energy Materials Research Laboratory (HEMRL)
 Indian Institute of Science Education and Research, Pune (IISER, Pune)
 Indian Institute of Tropical Meteorology (IITM)
 Inter-university Centre for Astronomy & Astrophysics (IUCAA)
 National AIDS Research Institute (NARI)
 National Centre for Cell Science (NCCS)
 National Centre for Radio Astrophysics (NCRA)
 National Chemical Laboratory (NCL)
 National Defence Academy (NDA)
 National Informatics Centre (NIC)
 National Institute of Bank Management (NIBM)
 National Institute of Construction Management and Research (NICMAR)
 National Institute of Virology (NIV)
 National School of Leadership (NSL)
 National Insurance Academy (NIA)
 Research & Development Establishment (Engineers) (R&DE(E))
 Tata Research Development and Design Centre (TRDDC)

Media
A number of Marathi-language newspapers from the British era continued publishing decades after independence. These included Kesari, Tarun Bharat, Prabhat and Sakal. Sakal has remained the most popular Marathi daily. Kesari is now only published as an online newspaper. The Mumbai-based Maharashtra Times, Loksatta and Lokmat have all introduced Pune based editions in the last fifteen years. The Mumbai-based popular English newspaper the Indian Express has a Pune edition. Its rival the Times of India introduced a tabloid called Pune Mirror in 2008. Mid-Day, Daily News and Analysis and Sakaal Times are other local English newspapers. The English-language newspaper The Hindu has launched a Pune edition covering local as well as national news.

The government owned All India Radio (AIR) has been broadcasting from Pune since 1953. Savitribai Phule Pune University broadcasts programmes focusing on its different departments and student welfare schemes on its own FM radio channel called Vidyavani. A number of commercial FM channels are also received in the city. The city receives almost all of the television channels in India including broadcast, cable and direct-to-home TV.

Transport

Public transport 

Public transport in Pune includes Pune Suburban Railway, bus services operated by PMPML and auto rickshaws. Uber and Ola Cabs also operate in the city. Construction of Pune Metro, an urban mass rapid transit system, is underway as of 2018.

Rail 

Pune Suburban Railway (electric multiple units) (popularly called local trains) connect Pune to the industrial city of Pimpri-Chinchwad and the hill station of Lonavala. Daily express trains connect Pune to Mumbai, Nashik, Ahmedabad, Chennai, Delhi, Hyderabad, Nanded, Miraj-Sangli ,Kolhapur Jaipur, Raipur, Nagpur, Visakhapatnam, Thiruvananthapuram, Kochi, Coimbatore, Bangalore, Allahabad, Kanpur, Howrah, Jammu Tawi, Vijayawada, Darbhanga, Goa, Gwalior, Varanasi, Bhubaneswar, Ranchi, Patna, and Jamshedpur. At Pune, there is a diesel locomotive shed and an electric trip shed. Pune Railway Station is administered by the Pune Railway Division of Central Railways.

Bus service 

Public buses within the city and its suburbs are operated by Pune Mahanagar Parivahan Mahamandal Limited (PMPML). PMPML operates the Rainbow BRTS system, the first of its kind in India, in which dedicated bus lanes were supposed to allow buses to travel quickly through the city. The project has turned out to be a failure, receiving little patronage from the local citizenry. Maharashtra State Road Transport Corporation runs buses from stations in Wakdewadi, Pune station, and Swargate to all major cities and towns in Maharashtra and neighbouring states. Private companies also run buses to major cities throughout India. In January 2019, Pune became the first Indian city to adopt e-buses and Bhekrai Nagar the country's first all electric bus depot. As of November 2019, up to 133 electric vehicles (EVs) have been deployed across the city in the first phase of its e-bus programme. The user's group is Pune Bus Pravasi Sangh.

Metro 

Pune Metro, a mass rapid transit system, is under construction and with 12 km of two lines currently in operation as of 6 March 2022. The detailed project report was prepared for the initial two lines by Delhi Metro Rail Corporation which was approved by the State government in 2012 and by the central government in December 2016. Line 1 will run underground between Swargate and Range Hills be and elevated until PCMC Bhavan. Line 2 will be completely elevated and will intersect Line 1 at the Civil Court interchange station in Shivajinagar.

Line 3 between Hinjawadi and Civil Court, Shivajinagar was approved by the state and central governments in January and March 2018, respectively. This 23.3-km line is being implemented by PMRDA on a public-private partnership basis.

Road transport

Pune is well-connected to other cities by Indian and state highways. National Highway 48 connects it to Mumbai and Bangalore, National Highway 65 connects it to Hyderabad and National Highway 60 connects it to Nashik. State Highway 27 connect Pune to Ahmednagar.

The Mumbai Pune Expressway is India's first six-lane high-speed expressway, and it was built in 2002. Only four wheeled vehicles are allowed on it. This expressway has reduced travel time between Pune and Mumbai to a little over two hours. A ring road is planned around the city.

Personal Transport 
Once known as the "cycle city of India", Pune has experienced a rapid growth in the number of motorised two wheelers replacing the bicycle. In 2005 the city was reported to have one million two wheelers. The report also stated that the increase in vehicular and industrial activity had led to a 10-fold increase in particulate pollution in some areas of the city. In 2018 the number of vehicles in the city has exceeded its population with 3.62 million total vehicles, 2.70 million being two wheelers. In the fiscal year 2017–18 alone 300,000 new vehicles were registered in the city, two-thirds of them two wheelers.

However, a 2011 report revealed that only  of tracks were actually built and most were unusable at the time of the report. Under the Smart Cities Mission, app based cycle sharing schemes have been launched in the city since late 2017. Cycles are also seen as a possible way of improving last mile connectivity for the metro system.

Air

Pune International Airport at Lohagaon is one of the busiest airports in India. The airport is operated by the Airports Authority of India. It shares its runways with the neighbouring Indian Air Force base. In addition to domestic flights to all major Indian cities, the airport has international direct flights to Dubai, operated by Air India Express, and SpiceJet. Pune International Airport at Lohegaon was ranked third best in the category of 5-15 million passengers by Airport Service Quality in 2018.

A new international airport has been proposed, due to the limited capacity of the existing airport. A location in the Chakan-Rajgurunagar area was chosen for the airport, but non-availability of land delayed the project for over a decade. The proposed airport in Purandar will be spread over 2,400 hectares. Chhatrapati Sambhaji Raje Airport is proposed to serve the city of Pune. The greenfield airport will be located near the villages of Ambodi, Sonori, Kumbharvalan, Ekhatpur-Munjawadi, Khanwadi, Pargaon Memane, Rajewadi, Aamble, Tekwadi, Vanpuri, Udachiwadi, Singapur near Saswad and Jejuri in Purandar taluka of Pune District.

International relations

Twin towns and sister cities
  San Jose, California, United States (1992)
  Vacoas-Phoenix, Mauritius
  Austin, Texas, United States – since 2018
  Fairbanks, Alaska, United States
  Matteson, Illinois, United States
Informal relationship
  Bremen, Germany
  Okayama, Japan

See also
 List of people from Pune
 Poonawalla
 List of tourist attractions in Pune
 Pune Metro

References

External links 
  for Pune City and District
 

 
Metropolitan cities in India
Smart cities in India
Cities and towns in Pune district
Paschim Maharashtra
Former capital cities in India
Cities in Maharashtra
Maharashtra
Populated places with period of establishment missing